Loda Halama (20 July 1911 – 13 July 1996) was a Polish dancer and actress. Principal dancer of Grand Theatre, Warsaw (1934–1936). She appeared in eleven films between 1927 and 1950.

Selected filmography
 Prokurator Alicja Horn (1933)
 Love, Cherish, Respect (1934)
 Augustus the Strong (1936)
 A Diplomatic Wife (1937)

References

External links

1911 births
1996 deaths
People from Płońsk County
People from Płock Governorate
Polish film actresses
Polish female dancers
Polish ballerinas
Burials at Powązki Cemetery
Polish cabaret performers
20th-century comedians
20th-century Polish actresses
20th-century Polish ballet dancers